Donn H. Hill is a United States Army major general who serves as the commanding general of the Security Force Assistance Command since May 16, 2022. He most recently served as the deputy commanding general for education of the United States Army Combined Arms Center, provost of the Army University and deputy commandant of the United States Army Command and General Staff College from July 2, 2020 to May 2022. He previously served as commanding general of the 2nd Security Force Assistance Brigade.

Dates of rank

References

Living people
Date of birth missing (living people)
Year of birth missing (living people)
University of Kentucky alumni
United States Army War College alumni
United States Army Command and General Staff College alumni
Recipients of the Legion of Merit
United States Army generals